Island in the Sky is a 1953 Warner Bros. American aviation adventure drama film written by Ernest K. Gann based on his 1944 novel of the same name, directed by William A. Wellman and starring and coproduced by John Wayne. Because of its realistic depiction of an actual aircraft crash, some consider the film as among the classic aviation films. The film also features Andy Devine, Lloyd Nolan, James Arness and Paul Fix.

Plot 
Pilot John Dooley and the crew of a World War II-era Douglas C-47 Skytrain (the military version of the DC-3) experience icy conditions and are forced to execute an emergency landing on a frozen lake in the uncharted wildlands near the Quebec–Labrador border. Dooley is a former airline pilot who had been pressed into duty hauling war supplies across the northern route to England. Far from settled country, the survivors can provide only an approximate position to rescuers.

At headquarters, Col. Fuller gathers fellow airmen who are determined to find the downed crew before the men succumb to hunger and the cold. The search pilots experience tension and fear and are unsure about their course of action, aware that a wrong decision could doom the missing crew.

Cast

 John Wayne as Captain Dooley
 Lloyd Nolan as Captain Stutz
 Walter Abel as Colonel Fuller
 James Arness as Mac McMullen, pilot
 Andy Devine as Willie Moon, pilot
 Allyn Joslyn as J. H. Handy
 Jimmy Lydon as Murray
 Harry Carey, Jr. as Ralph Hunt, Moon's co-pilot
 Hal Baylor as Stankowski
 Sean McClory as Frank Lovatt, Dooley's co-pilot
 Wally Cassell as D'Annunzia
 Gordon Jones as Walrus
 Frank Fenton as Captain Turner
 Robert Keys as Major Ditson
 Sumner Getchell as Lieutenant Cord
 Regis Toomey as Sergeant Harper
 Paul Fix as Wally Miller
 Jim Dugan as Gidley
 George Chandler as Rene
 Louis Jean Heydt as Fitch, pilot
 Bob Steele as Wilson
 Darryl Hickman as Swanson, McMullen's radioman
 Mike Connors (billed as Touch Connors) as Gainer
 Carl Switzer as Sonny Harper, Stutz's co-pilot
 Cass Gidley as Stannish
 Herbert Anderson (as Guy Anderson) as Breezy
 Tony De Mario as Ogden
 Fess Parker as Fitch's co-pilot (uncredited)
 John Indrisano as Mechanic (uncredited) 
 Dawn Bender as Murray's Wife (uncredited)
 Ann Doran as Moon's Wife (uncredited) 
 Ed Fury as Server in Officer's Mess (uncredited)
 William Wellman as voiceover narrator (uncredited)

Production 

The script was based on a true story about a flight on February 3, 1943, although its copilot was not killed as in the film. In his autobiography Fate Is the Hunter, on which the film of the same name is very loosely based, writer Ernest K. Gann related the true story and his role as one of the search pilots while serving with Air Transport Command at Presque Isle Airfield, Maine. Gann had been scheduled to fly the mission that ran into trouble, but was bumped from the flight by a more senior pilot.

The rights to the story were originally bought in January 1950 by Robert Stillman Productions, and Gann planned to write the screenplay with Seton I. Miller. Frank Rosenberg was scheduled to produce the film, which would star Richard Widmark. When Stillman dropped the film, the rights were picked up in December 1952 by Wayne-Fellows Productions, the partnership of John Wayne and Robert Fellows, as their third of seven eventual productions, including the following year's Gann story The High and the Mighty, also starring Wayne. The two films shared many of the same production staff and crew members, including director William Wellman.

Wellman had been a pilot with the Lafayette Flying Corps during World War I, where he earned the nickname Wild Bill, and with the United States Army Air Service after the war. He was a veteran aviation film director whose Wings won the first Academy Award (1927–1928). Wellman provides the voiceover narration that begins the film, and his two sons Tim and Mike, who were eleven and five at the time, play Andy Devine's sons. The women in the film, Ann Doran, Dawn Bender and Phyllis Winger, appear only in brief flashbacks and in a telephone conversation. The lack of a romantic interest was noted by critics, who considered the film a more authentic and gritty drama as compared to the usual Hollywood war pictures. Wellman had an adversarial relationship with actors and was known to prefer to work with men; many of his films are set in predominantly male worlds.

The role played by Wayne in Island in the Sky goes against type, as he does not display the machismo for which he was often criticized. His portrayal of the downed aircraft's captain had been noted as believable and realistic. A strong ensemble cast of mainly studio B-actors contained a number of future stars, including Fess Parker, James Arness, Darryl Hickman and Mike Connors, all of whom would realize television fame. The black-and-white cinematography by Archie Stout (dramatic scenes) and William H. Clothier (flying scenes) has been praised by critics.

Production began in late January 1953 and was completed on March 2. Filming took place partly at Donner Lake, near Truckee, California in the Sierra Nevada range. The California Department of Forestry felled trees in the area in order that aircraft runways could be fashioned in the four-foot-deep snow. Some background shooting also took place in San Francisco. In addition to writing the screenplay, Gann, a commercial pilot for Transocean Air Lines, served as the film's technical director and also piloted a C-47 for the second unit.

The hand-cranked emergency radio transmitter used by the crew members to try to contact rescuers was an actual piece of equipment, a BC-778/SCR-578/AN-CRT3 emergency transmitter, affectionately called Gibson Girl after the 1890s drawings of Charles Dana Gibson. The narrow-waisted shape of the device allowed the operator to hold it between the legs while cranking it—a necessity because it required 80 rpm and was difficult to crank.

Similarities to The High and the Mighty 
Island in the Sky and The High and the Mighty, released the following year, are two of the earliest all-star disaster films, paving the way for Airport and its sequels more than 20 years later, as well as the Airplane! parodies. The two films are among Wayne's early co-productions in which he starred. This practice would not become widespread until the 1980s and 1990s when many stars assumed control of productions. Both films were aviation dramas and shared many of the same crew members and production staff.

Along with Wayne, six actors appeared in both films: Regis Toomey, Paul Fix, Carl "Alfalfa" Switzer, Ann Doran, George Chandler and Michael Wellman (the director's son). Gann wrote both screenplays.

Release 
Island in the Sky premiered in Los Angeles on September 3, 1953 and entered general release two days later. The premiere showing featured stereophonic sound, but an intermission period was necessitated because of problems with it.

Reception 
In a contemporary review for The New York Times, critic Howard Thompson wrote:

Home video 
Both Island in the Sky and The High and the Mighty were out of circulation for about 20 years because of legal issues. They were restored, returned to television in July 2005 and released as special edition DVDs that August.

See also
 John Wayne filmography
 Island hopping
 Survival

References 
Notes

Bibliography

 Hardwick, Jack and Ed Schnepf. "A Viewer's Guide to Aviation Movies." The Making of the Great Aviation Films. General Aviation Series, Volume 2, 1989.
 Ricci, Mark and Boris and Steve Zmijewsky. The Films of John Wayne. New York: Citadel Press, 1970. .
 Shane, Bob. "The Makings of 'The High and the Mighty': A Former Airline Pilot Remembers the Filming of an Aviation Classic." Airpower, Volume 36, no. 1, January 2006.
 Sike, James R. "Fists, Dames & Wings." Air Progress Aviation Review, Volume 4, No. 4, October 1980.

External links 
 
 
 
 
 

1953 films
1953 adventure films
American adventure films
1950s English-language films
American aviation films
American disaster films
Films about aviation accidents or incidents
Films based on American novels
Films directed by William A. Wellman
Films produced by John Wayne
Batjac Productions films
Films scored by Emil Newman
Films set in Newfoundland and Labrador
Films set in the Arctic
Films about the United States Air Force
Warner Bros. films
American black-and-white films
1950s American films